İnhisar District is a district of the Bilecik Province of Turkey. Its seat is the town İnhisar. Its area is 244 km2, and its population is 2,183 (2021).

Composition
There is one municipality in İnhisar District:
 İnhisar

There are 9 villages in İnhisar District:

 Akköy
 Çayköy
 Harmanköy
 Hisarcık
 Koyunlu
 Muratça
 Samrı
 Tarpak
 Tozman

References

Districts of Bilecik Province